Torfaen County Borough Council is the governing body for Torfaen, one of the Principal Areas of Wales.

History
The borough council was created in 1974 under the Local Government Act 1972 as a lower-tier district council with borough status. Gwent County Council provided county-level services for the area. The county council was abolished in 1996 and Torfaen became a principal area with county borough status, with the council taking over the functions previously performed by the county council.

Borough status allows Torfaen to give the chair of the council the title of mayor. However, the council discontinued the role of mayor in 2018. A presiding member role has been created instead to chair meetings.

Political control
The first election to the council was held in 1973, initially operating as a shadow authority before coming into its powers on 1 April 1974. Political control of the council since 1974 has been held by the following parties:

Lower-tier borough

County borough

Leadership
The leaders of the council since 1984 have been:

Current composition
As at 5 May 2022:

Party with majority control in bold.

Elections
Summary of the council composition after council elections:

Party with the most elected councillors in bold. Coalition agreements in notes column

Premises
The council is based at the Civic Centre on Hanbury Road in Pontypool, comprising Pontypool Town Hall, built in 1856, and a large extension to it which was built in 1991. Between 1996 and 2012, the council also used the six-storey former Gwent County Hall at Croesyceiliog, Cwmbran, sharing the building with Monmouthshire County Council. County Hall closed because of "concrete cancer" and was later demolished, with the council consolidating its offices at the Civic Centre in Pontypool.

Mayoralty 
The roles of mayor and deputy mayor were removed from the council in May 2018 as part of the 2018/19 budget. Instead, the council created the post of Presiding Member and Deputy Presiding Member to chair council meetings. From May 2018, the roles and functions undertaken by a mayor have been undertaken by the leader of the council and cabinet members.

Past Mayors
The mayors of Torfaen from 1974 until the post's abolition in 2018 were:

1974–1974: G M Day
1974–1975: D B Richards
1975–1976: M L Lee
1976–1977: D W Puddle
1977–1978: G S R Powell
1978–1979: S E A James
1979–1980: A J Davies
1980–1981: G S Evans
1981–1982: K Morgan
1982–1983: P Roberts
1983–1984: G I Davies
1984–1985: C Little
1985–1986: H J Rosser
1986–1986: C G Thomas
1986–1988: D J Lloyd
1988–1989: W M Howell
1989–1990: B J Cunningham
1990–1991: S Richards
1991–1992: D J Rex
1992–1993: T Davies
1993–1994: F H Bacon
1994–1995: M H Morgan
1995–1996: D Miller
1996–1997: S Smith
1997–1998: S J Brooks
1998–1999: K Edmunds
1999–2000: B I Ryan
2000–2001: G R Clark
2001–2002: C Thomas
2002–2003: Jack Everson
2003–2004: Doug Davies
2004–2005: Yvonne Warren
2005–2006: Lyndon Irwin
2006–2007: Mary Barnett
2007–2008: Bill King
2008–2009: Nye James
2009–2010: Bob Jones
2010–2011: Tom Huish
2011–2012: Philip Seabourne
2012–2013: Wayne Tomlinson
2013–2014: Neil Mason
2014–2015: Mandy Owen
2015–2016: Giles Davies
2016–2017: Veronica Crick
2017–2018: Jessica Powell

Electoral divisions

The county borough is divided into 20 electoral wards, returning 40 councillors. There are 6 elected community councils in the region. The following table lists council wards, communities and associated geographical areas. Communities with a community council are indicated with a '*':

References

External links
Torfaen County Borough Council

Torfaen
Torfaen
1996 establishments in Wales